Kota Shivaram Karanth (10 October 1902 – 9 December 1997), also abbreviated as K. Shivaram Karanth, was an Indian polymath, who was a novelist in Kannada language, playwright and an ecological conservationist. Ramachandra Guha called him the "Rabindranath Tagore of Modern India, who has been one of the finest novelists-activists since independence". He was the third writer to be decorated with the Jnanpith Award for Kannada, the highest literary honor conferred in India. His son Ullas is an ecological conservationist.

Early life
Shivaram Karanth was born on 10 October 1902, in Kota near Kundapura in the Udupi district of Karnataka to a Kannada-speaking Smartha Bhramin family. The fifth child of his parents Shesha Karantha and Lakshmamma, he completed his primary education in Kundapura and Mangalore. Shivaram Karanth was influenced by Gandhi's principles and took part in Indian Independence movement when he was in college. His participation in the Non-cooperation movement did not allow him to complete his college education which he quit in February 1922. He canvassed for khadi and swadeshi in Karnataka led by Indian National Congress leader Karnad Sadashiva Rao, for five years till 1927. By that time, Karanth had already started writing fiction novels and plays.

Career
Karanth began writing in 1924 and soon published his first book, Rashtrageetha Sudhakara, a collection of poems. His first novel was Vichitrakoota. Subsequent works like Nirbhagya Janma ("Unfortunate Birth") and Sooleya Samsara ("Family of a Prostitute") mirrored the pathetic conditions of the poor. His magnum opus Devaddhootaru, a satire on contemporary India, was published in 1928.

Karanth was an intellectual and environmentalist who made notable contribution to the art and culture of Karnataka. He is considered one of the most influential novelists in the Kannada language. His novels Marali Mannige, Bettada Jeeva, Alida Mele, Mookajjiya Kanasugalu, Mai Managala Suliyalli, Ade OOru Ade Mara, Shaneeshwarana Neralinalli, Kudiyara Koosu, Svapnada Hole, Sarsammana Samadhi, and Chomana Dudi are widely read and have received critical acclaim. He wrote two books on Karnataka's ancient stage dance-drama Yakshagana (1957 and 1975).

He was involved in experiments in the technique of printing for some years in the 1930s and 1940s and printed his own novels, but incurred financial losses. He was also a painter and was deeply concerned with the issue of nuclear energy and its impact on the environment. At the age of 90, he wrote a book on birds (published during 2002 by Manohara Grantha Mala, Dharwad).

He wrote, apart from his forty-seven novels, thirty-one plays, four short story collections, six books of essays and sketches, thirteen books on art, two volumes of poems, nine encyclopedias, and over one hundred articles on various issues. His Mookajjiya Kanasugalu novel won Jnanpith award.

Personal life 
Karanth married Leela Alva, a student in the school that Karanth taught dance and directed plays in. Leela belonged to the Bunt community and was the daughter of a businessman, K. D. Alva. They married on 6 May 1936. The couple subsequently attracted ridicule from people in the region over their inter-caste marriage; Karanth belonged to an orthodox Brahmin community. Leela, who had her early education in Marathi language, re-learnt Kannada after marriage and translated the Marathi novel Pan Lakshat Kon Gheto into Kannada. As a dancer, she participated in Karanth's operas. The Karanths had four children together: sons, Harsha and Ullas, a conservationist; and daughters, Malavika and Kshama. His mother's influence on Karanth was described by Ullas as: "It was our mother who shaped Karanth's life... She was the backbone of all his endeavours. She was also quite well-read, and she dedicated all of her talents to her husband. She took care of all household responsibilities." The family lived in the Puttur town of Dakshina Kannada, a district in the South Karnataka region, before moving to Saligrama, a town  from Karanth's birthplace Kota, in 1974. A few years prior to this, their eldest son Harsha died leaving Leela suffer from "depression and hallucinations". Leela died in September 1986. It was also the year that Karanth's final novel was published.

Karanth was admitted to Kasturba Medical College in Manipal on 2 December 1997 to be treated for viral fever. He suffered from a cardiac respiratory arrest two days later and slipped into a coma. On 8 December, his kidneys began to fail and he subsequently developed severe acidosis and sepsis, following which he was put on dialysis. Efforts to revive him failed and he died at 11:35 a.m. (IST) the following day, aged 95. The government of Karnataka declared a two-day mourning in the State as a mark of respect.

Popularity
Many of Karanth's novels have been translated into other Indian languages. Marali Mannige got translated to English by Padma Ramachandra Sharma, has been conferred the State Sahitya Akademi award.

Memorial

Shivarama Karantha Balavana
Shivarama Karantha Balavana is notable for its fame under the name of the Jnanapeeta awardee Dr. K. Shivarama Karantha, who lived in Puttur. In his memory his home now houses a museum, a park, and a recreation center.

Literary and national honors

 Jnanapith Award – 1978
 Sahitya Akademi Fellowship (1985)
 Sangeet Natak Akademi Fellowship (1973)
 Padma Bhushan (He returned his Padma Bhushan honour in protest against the Emergency imposed in India)
 Sahitya Academy award – 1959
 Karnataka state Sahitya Akademi Award
 Rajyotsava Prashasti – 1986
 Sangeet Natak Award
 Pampa Award
 Swedish Academy award
 Tulsi Samman (1990)
 Dadabhai Nauroji Award (1990)
 Honorary Doctorate from Mysore University, Meerut University, Karnatak University and others.

Film awards
 National Film Award – (Posthumously)
 National Film Award – Special Jury Award / Special Mention Writer – Bettada Jeeva – K. Shivaram Karanth – 2011

Writings

Novels

 Mookajjiya Kanasugalu ("Dreams of Mookajji Granny") (Jnanpith award winning novel)
 Marali Mannige ("Back to the Soil")
 Chomana Dudi ("Drum of Choma")
 Mai Managala Suliyalli ("In the Whirlpool of Body and Soul")
 Bettada Jeeva ("Life in the Hills")
 Sarasammana Samadhi ("Grave of Sarasamma")
 Dharmarayana Samsara ("Family of Dharmaraya")
 Alida Mele ("After Death")
 Kudiyara Kusu ("Infant of Kudiya")
 Mailikallinodane Matukate ("Conversation with the Milestone")
 Chiguridha Kanasu
 Mugida Yudda ("Completed War")
 Moojanma
 Dharmarayana Samsara
 Kevala Manushyaru
 Illeyamba
 Iddaru Chinthe
 Navu Kattida Swarga
 Nashta Diggajagalu
 Kanniddu Kanaru
 Gedda Doddasthike
 Kannadiyalli Kandatha
 Antida Aparanji
 Halliya Hattu Samastharu
 Sameekshe
 Moga Padeda Mana
 Shaneeshwarana Neralinalli
 Nambidavara Naka Naraka
 Oudaryada Urulalli
 Onti Dani
 Odahuttidavaru
 Swapnada Hole
 Jaruva Dariyalli
 Ukkida Nore
 Balveye Belaku
 Ala Nirala
 Gondaranya
 Ade Uru Ade Mara
 Innonde Dari
 Jagadoddara Na
 Bathada Thore

Science Books

 Nature, Science and Environment
 Vijnana prapancha ("The World of Science")
 Adbhuta jagattu ("Wonderful World")
 Prani Prapancha
 Prani Prapanchada Vismayagalu
 Pakshigala Adbhuta Loka

Plays
 Yaksagana – English translation, Indira Gandhi National Center for the Arts (1997)
 Yakshagana Bayalata

Children's books
 Dum Dum Dolu
 Oduva Ata
 Vishala Sagaragalu
 Balaprapancha – Makkalavishwakosha – Vol 1,2,3
 Mailikallinodane Matukathegalu
 Mariyappana Sahasagalu
 Nachiketa – Ack
 Ibbara Gaja Panditaru
 Oduva Ata – Sirigannada Pathamale
 Mathina Sethuve
 Jatayu Hanumanta
 Huliraya

Autobiography
 Hucchu Manasina Hatthu Mukhagalu (English translation: "Ten Faces of a Crazy Mind", by H Y Sharada Prasad)
 Smriti Pataladinda  (Vol 1–3)

Travelogue
 Abuvinda Baramakke
 Arasikaralla
 Apoorva Paschima ("Incomparable West")
 Paataalakke Payana ("Travel to the nether world")

Biography
 Panje Mangesharayaru : Kannada Nadu Mattu Kannadigara Parampare
 Sri Ramakrishnara Jeevana Charithre

Art, Architecture and Other
 Kaladarshana
 Bharatheya Chitrakale
 Jnana ("Knowledge")
 Sirigannada Artha Kosha
 Kala Prapancha
 Yaksharangakkagi Pravasa
 Arivina Ananda
 Life The Only Light – A Guide To Saner Living
 Chalukya Shilpakale

Kannada  and Cinema
 Chomana Dudi
 Chigurida Kanasu
 Maleya Makkalu (from Kudiyara Koosu Novel)
 Bettada Jeeva
 8 September (Tulu)
 Mookajjiya Kanasugalu (Kannada)

See also
 Kannada
 Kannada literature
 Yakshagana.

References

Further reading

 Malini Mallya, Hattiradinda Kanda Hattu Mukhagalu
 Malini Mallya, Naanu Kanda Karantaru

1902 births
1997 deaths
20th-century Indian poets
Indian atheists
Indian environmentalists
Indian male dramatists and playwrights
Indian male novelists
Kannada poets
Kannada-language writers
People from Udupi district
Recipients of the Jnanpith Award
Recipients of the Padma Bhushan in literature & education
Recipients of the Sahitya Akademi Award in Kannada
Novelists from Karnataka
20th-century Indian novelists
Poets from Karnataka
Dramatists and playwrights from Karnataka
20th-century Indian male writers
Special Mention (feature film) National Film Award winners
Best Story National Film Award winners
Magic realism writers
Recipients of the Sangeet Natak Akademi Fellowship